Prendre l'air is the third album by French singer Shy'm. It was released in June 2010 and five singles ("Je sais", "Je suis moi", "Prendre l'air", "Tourne" and "En apesanteur") have been released. A departure from the R&B sound that Shy'm had previously been accustomed to, Prendre l'air showed a more pop-oriented side to her musical persona. The album debuted on the French album chart at #6, and has since gone on to be certified 3× Platinum, becoming Shy'm's most successful album. It has been released in three editions: standard, collector and deluxe.

Commercial performance 
The album debuted at #6 on the French album chart on the week ending 19 June 2010. This matched the peak of debut album Mes fantaisies but failed to match the peak of second album Reflets. However, a successful singles run and good promotion allowed the album to stay high in the charts for a long time. The album eventually spent 117 weeks in the French albums top 200. It was certified Triple Platinum, becoming Shy'm's best selling album to date.

Singles 
The first single released from the album was "Je sais" (English: "I Know"), an uptempo number signifying Shy'm's change in sound. "Je sais" was not released physically and thus did not chart (at the time, the official French singles chart was CD singles only), but reached #3 on the country's digital chart. It became her highest-peaking song on the digital chart until "Et alors !", two years later.

The second single was "Je suis moi" (English: "I Am Me"). Like the previous single, "Je suis moi" was not released physically. It did however peak at #7 on the country's digital chart.

The third single from the album was the title track, "Prendre l'air" (English: "Get Some Fresh Air"). Unlike the previous singles, this was eligible to chart, for the official chart now counted downloads. However, it was only able to peak at #21. The fourth single, "Tourne" (English: "Turn") peaked at #35, and the final single "En apesanteur" (English: "Weightless") reached #32.

Track listing

Charts

Certifications

Release history

References

External links
 Official Site
 Music Videos :  //  //  //  // En Apesanteur

Shy'm albums
2010 albums
French-language albums